Edmund Holland, 4th Earl of Kent, 5th Baron Holand, KG (6 January 1383 15 September 1408) was the Earl of Kent from 1400 to 1408. He was the 106th Knight of the Order of the Garter in 1403.

Edmund was born in Brockenhurst, Hampshire, the second son of Thomas Holland, 2nd Earl of Kent and Alice Fitzalan. He was a younger brother of Thomas Holland, 1st Duke of Surrey; Edmund succeeded his childless brother as Earl of Kent on 7 January 1400. He was "appointed admiral of the west and north in 1407".

He married at St. Mary Overy, Southwark, on 24 January 1407, Lucia Visconti (c. 13804 April 1424), daughter of Bernabò Visconti, Lord of Milan, and wife Beatrice Regina della Scala, without issue. Shortly before the marriage, he had an affair with Constance of York and fathered illegitimately Eleanor de Holland born in c. 1407; Eleanor was later married to James Tuchet, 5th Baron Audley.

Edmund was killed at the battle of Île-de-Bréhat on 15 September 1408. As he had no legitimate issue, the earldom then became extinct. He is buried at Bourne Abbey in Lincolnshire.

References

Bibliography
 Alison Weir. Britain's Royal Family: A Complete Genealogy. London, The Bodley Head, 1999, p. 111.
 
 
 
 
 

|-

History of Kent
Knights of the Garter
1384 births
1408 deaths
15th-century English Navy personnel
15th-century English people
Earls of Kent (1360 creation)
8
English military personnel killed in action
Edmund
English admirals
Lord High Admirals of England